Xalatlaco is a municipality in Mexico State in Mexico. The municipality covers an area of  93.23 km². It is one of the 17 municipalities that border Mexico City, bordering the capital city's southwest side.

As of the 2010 census, the municipality had a total population of 26,865 inhabitants.

Towns and villages

The largest localities (cities, towns, and villages) are:

References

Municipalities of the State of Mexico
Populated places in the State of Mexico